It was a Dacian fortified town.

References

External links
 Aşezarea fortificată getică de la Bâzdâna, jud. Dolj

Dacian fortresses in Dolj County
Historic monuments in Dolj County